The Verbandsliga Nordbaden is a German amateur football division administered by the Baden Football Association, one of the 21 German state football associations. Being the top flight of the Baden state association, the Verbandsliga is currently a level 6 division of the German football league system.

Overview 
The league was formed as Amateurliga Nordbaden in 1945 in the northern half of the then-state of Württemberg-Baden, which is now the northwestern part of the German state of Baden-Württemberg. It was a feeder league to the Oberliga Süd and therefore the second tier of the football league system in the south of Germany until the inception of the 2nd Oberliga Süd in 1950. From 1950 until the establishment of the Oberliga Baden-Württemberg in 1978, it was the third tier of the football league system.

The winner of the Amateurliga Nordbaden was not automatically promoted but rather had to take part in a promotion play-off to its league above. Usually, the champion had to compete with the winners of the Amateurligas Südbaden, Württemberg and (from 1961) Schwarzwald-Bodensee.

The separation of North Baden and South Baden resulted from the outcome of World War II when the state was split into two separate occupation zones. The north was in the American zone and the south in the French zone. The official names for the two FA's reflect the separation of South Baden from the original association, with North Baden just simply calling itself Baden FA.

The league was established in 1945 with ten teams, the winner gaining promotion to the Oberliga Süd. The founder members were:

VfL Neckarau
VfB Knielingen
VfB Mühlburg
VfR Pforzheim
ASV Feudenheim
SpVgg Sandhofen
Amicitia Viernheim
FV Daxlanden
Phönix Mannheim
1. FC Pforzheim

The league was split into a northern and a southern group from 1946 to 1948.

With the introduction of the Bundesliga in 1963, the Amateurliga was placed below the new Regionalliga Süd but still retained its third-tier status.
It continued to do so after the introduction of the 2nd Bundesliga Süd in 1974.

The longest continuous member of the league was the SV Sandhausen, which gained promotion to it in 1957 and spent 21 seasons in it until its admittance to the new Oberliga in 1978. The VfR Pforzheim spent a record of 28 out of 33 possible seasons in the league.

At the same time as the Oberliga Baden-Württemberg was introduced in 1978, the Amateurliga Nordbaden was renamed Verbandsliga Nordbaden. The top five teams out of the Amateurliga went to the new Oberliga while the rest of the teams found themselves in the Verbandsliga. The league was now set at tier four of the league system.

The winner of the Verbandsliga gains direct promotion to the Oberliga. The runners-up have a play-off against the runners-up of the Verbandsliga Südbaden. The winner of this play-off has to face the runners-up of the Verbandsliga Württemberg for the final Oberliga spot. In 1981, no extra spots, and in 1994 three extra spots were available due to league format changes.

Feeder leagues to the Verbandsliga Nordbaden:

Landesliga Mittelbaden
Landesliga Odenwald
Landesliga Rhein/Neckar

The term "Verbandsliga" translates as "Football Association League". There are 21 football associations within the German Football Association, North Baden being one of them.

League champions
The league champions of the league:

Bold denotes team gained promotion.
In 1950, three teams were promoted to the new 2nd Oberliga Süd.
In 1965, VfR Pforzheim gained promotion as runners–up as the reserve team of Karlsruher SC was ineligible.
In 2019, the reserve team of SV Sandhausen gained promotion as runners-up when VfB Gartenstadt declined.
In 2020, 1. FC Bruchsal also gained promotion as runners-up due to Oberliga expansion.
In 2021, the season was curtailed and voided because of the COVID-19 pandemic in Germany.

Teams promoted to the Oberliga after play–offs 
Since the 1978–79 seasons the runners–up have the opportunity to play–off for promotion. The following runners–up have succeeded in the promotion round:
1982 SV Schwetzingen
1983 FV 09 Weinheim
1985 FV Lauda
1989 Amicitia Viernheim
1994 Amicitia Viernheim
1996 SGK Heidelberg
2001 Waldhof Mannheim II
2003 TSG Hoffenheim II
2009 TSG Weinheim
2011 VfR Mannheim
2014 FC Germania Friedrichstal
2015 1. CfR Pforzheim

League placings

The complete list of clubs in the league and their league placings since 1994.

Key

 S = No. of seasons in league (as of 2022–23)

Notes
 1 In 1995, VfR Pforzheim withdrew from the Oberliga.
 2 In 1998, FV 09 Weinheim joined TSG Weinheim.
 3 In 2002, VfR Mannheim withdrew to the Landesliga.
 4 In 2003, Waldhof Mannheim II withdrew from the Oberliga.
 5 In 2010, 1. FC Pforzheim merged with VfR Pforzheim to form 1. CfR Pforzheim.
 6 In 2008, SpVgg Amicitia Viernheim merged with TSV Viernheim to form TSV Amicitia Viernheim and in 2017, Amiticia withdrew from the Verbandsliga.
 7 In 2014, TSV Grunbach withdrew from the Oberliga.
 8 In 2020, VfB Gartenstadt withdrew from the Verbandsliga.
 9 In 2021, SV Sandhausen II withdrew from the Oberliga.

References

Sources
 Deutschlands Fußball in Zahlen,  An annual publication with tables and results from the Bundesliga to Verbandsliga/Landesliga. DSFS.
 Kicker Almanach,  The yearbook on German football from Bundesliga to Oberliga, since 1937. Kicker Sports Magazine.
 Süddeutschlands Fußballgeschichte in Tabellenform 1897-1988  History of Southern German football in tables, by Ludolf Hyll.
 Die Deutsche Liga-Chronik 1945-2005  History of German football from 1945 to 2005 in tables. DSFS. 2006.

External links 
 Das deutsche Fußball-Archiv  Historic German league tables
 Fussball.de: Verbandsliga Nordbaden  
 BFV: Baden Football Association 

Nord
Football competitions in Baden-Württemberg
1945 establishments in Germany